11th Song is the debut studio album by alternative rock band Deep Blue Something. It was released on Doberman Records in 1993.

Details
Doberman Records was headed by Louis Bickel, Jr. Bickel had first met the band in 1992 when they were called "Leper Messiah", and becoming friendly with them, learned they were trying to release a debut CD but lacked the financing to do so. In late 1992, Bickel paid at least $3,000 to finance the recording of the album.  Initially the CD had modest sales, primarily sold at the band's shows, but sales grew. The album's version of "Breakfast at Tiffany's" was later re-recorded for the band's next album, Home.

Track listing
All songs written by Todd and Toby Pipes, except where noted.
"One for Reality" – 4:50
"Raise Your Hands" – 5:16
"7 A.M." – 4:09
"You" – 3:29
"She'll Go to Pieces" – 5:11
"Someday" – 4:40
"No More" – 2:50
"Loneliest Man" – 4:39
"What a Single Word Can Do" – 3:52
"Breakfast at Tiffany's" (Todd Pipes) – 5:18
"11th Song" (Hidden track) – 9:44

Personnel
 Todd Pipes – bass guitar, lead & backing vocals
 Toby Pipes – acoustic & electric guitars, lead & backing vocals
 John Kirtland – drums, percussion

References

1993 debut albums
Deep Blue Something albums